Le Séchey is a part of Le Lieu, a municipality in the La Vallée district in the canton of Vaud, Switzerland.

Villages in the canton of Vaud
Villages in Switzerland